Heathfield Hall (sometimes referred to as Heathfield House) was a house in Handsworth, Staffordshire (the area became part of Birmingham in 1911), England, built for the engineer James Watt.

In 1790, Watt's business partner Matthew Boulton recommended to Watt his friend, the architect Samuel Wyatt, who had designed Boulton's home, Soho House, in 1789. Watt commissioned Wyatt to design Heathfield Hall.

Watt died in the house in 1819, and was buried at nearby St Mary's Church. His garret workshop was then sealed, and few people were ever allowed to visit it. The contents - over 8,300 objects, including the furniture, window, door and floorboards - were removed in 1924 and used to recreate the room at the Science Museum in London, where they may still be viewed.

After a series of subsequent owners who had slowly sold off the associated lands for development of semi-detached villas, in the 1880s engineer George Tangye bought Heathfield Hall. He lived in the house until his death in 1920. After his family sold the house, from 1927 the hall was demolished and the lands redeveloped.

What was the Heathfield Estate is now the land that comprises West Drive and North Drive in Handsworth, developed in the 1930s with a number of arts and crafts and moderne-style houses.

References 

Houses in Birmingham, West Midlands
James Watt
Handsworth, West Midlands
Houses completed in 1790
1927 in England
1790 in England
Demolished buildings and structures in the West Midlands (county)